The Temple Theatre is a historic theater built by the Elf Khurafeh Shriners and opened in 1927 in Saginaw, Michigan. The theater was restored in late 2002 by Shaheen Development, and reopened under new owners to host events in the Saginaw area.

Events

The Temple Theatre has hosted a variety of entertainers.  In 2006, Jim Brickman, Three Men and a Tenor, B.B. King and George Carlin graced the stage of the historic Temple Theatre. The Temple Theatre also hosted America as part of the band's 50th Anniversary Tour on April 8, 2022 and comedian Tom Segura for two shows including one sold out performance on August 9, 2022.

The Temple Theatre also shows a number of films on the big screen.  The Muppet Christmas Carol, Miracle on 34th Street, and Peter Jackson's King Kong were shown in late 2006.

References

External links

 
 Temple Theatre at Film-Tech Cinema Systems
 Temple Theatre at CinemaTour

Cinemas and movie theaters in Michigan
Buildings and structures in Saginaw, Michigan
Tourist attractions in Saginaw County, Michigan
Theatres completed in 1927
1927 establishments in Michigan
Theatres completed in 2002
Concert halls in Michigan
Public venues with a theatre organ
Shriners